"Touch Me I'm Sick/Halloween" is a split single by American alternative rock bands Sonic Youth and Mudhoney, released in December 1988 by the independent record label Sub Pop.

Prior to the release of Mudhoney's "Touch Me I'm Sick" single in March 1988, Bruce Pavitt sent a five-song Mudhoney tape to Sonic Youth for the band's opinion. Sonic Youth immediately proposed a split single where each band covered the other. Sonic Youth covered "Touch Me I'm Sick", while Mudhoney covered Sonic Youth's "Halloween". The split single was released on 7" vinyl as a limited edition by Sub Pop in December 1988. It was released on 12" vinyl in the UK by Blast First in January 1989, and in Germany in 1990 by Glitterhouse Records.

Sonic Youth's "Touch Me I'm Sick" cover was later included on the deluxe edition of Daydream Nation, released on June 12, 2007, while Mudhoney's cover of "Halloween" was featured in the 2008 deluxe edition reissue of Superfuzz Bigmuff. The front and back cover photographs were taken by Charles Peterson.

Sonic Youth's version offered a female perspective of the song, with bassist Kim Gordon handling the vocals. Bradford Allison of Prefix magazine suggested that because of this, the cover "seems even grimier than the original".

Track listing

7" vinyl, SP26
Sonic Youth: "Touch Me I'm Sick" (Arm, Lukin, Peters, Turner) – 2:36
Mudhoney: "Halloween" (Sonic Youth) – 6:07

Charts

Year-end charts

Personnel

On "Touch Me I'm Sick",
Kim Gordon – lead vocals, bass
Thurston Moore – guitar, backing vocals  
Lee Ranaldo – guitar
Alex Damen – lead guitar
Steve Shelley – drums 
Wharton Tiers – producer

On "Halloween",
Mark Arm – lead vocals, guitar
Steve Turner – guitar, backing vocals
Matt Lukin – bass
Dan Peters – drums

References
Azerrad, Michael. Our Band Could Be Your Life: Scenes from the American Indie Underground, 1981-1991. Little Brown and Company, 2001.

Notes

1988 singles
Sonic Youth songs
Mudhoney songs
Split singles
Sub Pop singles